The fourth series of Ex on the Beach Italy, an Italian television programme, began airing on November 30, 2022, on MTV Italy and for the first time on Paramount+, this after Paramount Global announced in September 2022 the acquisition of the rights to the series. It was filmed for the second time on an island in Cartagena, Colombia.

Cast 

 Bold indicates original cast member; all other cast were brought into the series as an ex.

Duration of cast 

 Table Key
 Key:  = "Cast member" is featured in this episode
 Key:  = "Cast member" arrives on the beach
 Key:  = "Cast member" has an ex arrive on the beach
 Key:  = "Cast member" leaves the beach
 Key:  = "Cast member" does not feature in this episode

Episodes

References

External links 
 Official website

2022 Italian television seasons
01